Waiting for the Sunrise is the fourth album by American jazz vocalist and saxophone player Camille Thurman. It was released by Chesky Records on August 24, 2018 and debuted at No. 2 on the Billboard magazine Traditional Jazz Album Chart.

NPR called the album a "full display" of Thurman's talents on vocals and saxophone, and JazzTimes said "track for track, the recording is a revelation."

Awards
 17th Independent Music Award - Jazz Album with Vocals - Waiting for the Sunrise 
 17th Independent Music Award - Jazz Song with Vocals - "The Nearness of You" 
 NAACP 50th Image Awards Nominated - Outstanding Jazz Album

Track listing 
 "I Just Found Out About Love" – 3:26
 "Some of These Days" – 6:31
 "Tarde" – 3:32
 "After You've Gone" – 7:41
 "September in the Rain" – 4:44
 "The Nearness of You" – 5:03
 "Easy to Love" – 3:03
 "I'm on Your Side" – 5:42
 "World Waiting for Sunrise" – 7:21
 "If You Love Me (Really Love Me)" – 3:59

Personnel 
 Camille Thurman - vocals, tenor saxophone
 Jeremy Pelt - trumpet
 Jack Wilkins - guitar
 Cecil McBee - bass
 Steve Williams - drums
 David Chesky - producer
 Norman Chesky - producer

References

2018 albums
Chesky Records albums
Jazz albums by American artists